Marysburg Assumption Church & Centre Of The Arts is a Roman Catholic church in the hamlet of Marysburg within the Rural Municipality of Humboldt in Saskatchewan, Canada. The church was designated as a municipal heritage building on September 13, 1983.  The brick building contains two towers and is of a Romanesque Revival style while the interior exhibits a Classical Revival influence. The Assumption Church is 12.8 km north (8 miles) of Humboldt, Saskatchewan on Hwy 20 and 3.2 km (2 miles) east on Marysburg Grid 756.

The church can hold over 400 people and makes extensive use of stained glass. The interior is decorated with works by the artist Berthold Imhoff. Thirty two Imhoff paintings were purchased in 1948.

Restoration
Assumption Church Restoration Committee was formed in 1998, when the parish had shrunk to 25 families.  These families, as well as a great many Marysburg expatriates, were very fond of their fine church and decided to undertake the huge task of restoration

From 1998 to the end of 2003, new furnaces were installed, the foundation repaired, the brick exterior repaired, insulation pumped between roof and ceiling, and both nave and side wings given new roofs.  This was financed entirely by local initiative.

2004 saw the start of major renovations to the interior.  Mike Labelle of Western Restoration was hired  and as a result the interior of the church was plastered and painted.  Paintings by Berthold Imhoff were cleaned, repaired and remounted on the walls of the church in the winter of 2006.

New Tiles Being Installed
New roof tiles
Work continues on the stained-glass windows and wood floors, a
s the restoration of this church continues fundraising events and donations from individuals and companies across Canada have contributed greatly to this cause.  An annual publication of the newspaper The Marysburg Town Crier is sent out every November to all former residents of the Marysburg area.  This paper helps our restoration committee to report our achievements and update and advertise upcoming events pertaining to our restoration efforts.

The Assumption Church Restoration Committee received the Saskatchewan Architectural Heritage Award in September 2009 in the category of long-term stewardship.

Church use
The Assumption church, still an integral part of a functioning parish community, is also being utilized as a venue to showcase talent of local, regional and national performing and visual arts. The use of the church's superb Steinway grand piano as well as Yamaha organ is available at any event in the church, be it Wedding, Baptism, Funeral, Concert, Recital. The church, with its second level balcony (choir loft) seats over 400 people. With its extensive grounds, separate hall (complete with full kitchen) next door, the grandeur of the church continues to draw many former Marysburgers back home for family reunions and other community events. Camping (40 non-serviced lots) available on site, makes all planning for a major event much easier.

References

Roman Catholic churches completed in 1920
Roman Catholic churches in Saskatchewan
Humboldt No. 370, Saskatchewan
20th-century Roman Catholic church buildings in Canada